Swintayla Marie "Swin" Cash Canal (born September 22, 1979) is an American former professional basketball player who played professionally for 15 seasons in the Women's National Basketball Association (WNBA).  She currently serves as vice president of basketball operations and team development for the New Orleans Pelicans. A prolific scorer and rebounder, as well as a capable ball handler and defender, she helped lead the University of Connecticut women's basketball team to national titles in 2000 and 2002. In her second WNBA season, she led the Detroit Shock to their first ever WNBA title. In 2015, she was named a studio analyst for MSG Networks covering the New York Knicks pre-games and post-games as well as the weekly coaches show. In 2017, Cash was named the Director of franchise development for the New York Liberty. Cash was inducted into the Naismith Memorial Basketball Hall of Fame on September 9, 2022.

Cash is one of 11 women to receive an Olympic gold medal, an NCAA Championship, a Fiba World cup gold and a WNBA Championship.

Personal life
Cash was born in the Pittsburgh suburb of McKeesport and raised by her mother, Cynthia. She has two brothers named Stephen and Kevin Menifee and one sister, Angelique Menifee. She holds basketball camps and clinics under her company, Swin Cash Enterprise LLC, and is involved in charity events through the WNBA. Cash married longtime boyfriend Steve Canal in Atlanta, Georgia.

High school
Cash attended McKeesport Area High School in McKeesport, where she participated in many activities. She "tried her hands at" baseball, track, and cheerleading, but her true passion was entertainment, which she expressed in school plays and drama class. Cash is best known for her basketball skills, which earned her a place on the national WBCA All-American team. She participated in the WBCA High School All-America Game where she scored fourteen points, and earned MVP honors.

College
Cash was an All-American at the University of Connecticut (UConn). She won the NCAA Women's Division I Basketball Championship with the UConn Huskies in 2000 and 2002. She also helped lead UConn to an undefeated 39–0 season in 2002. Swin was a member of the inaugural class (2006) of inductees to the University of Connecticut women's basketball "Huskies of Honor" recognition program.

Professional career
Cash was selected by the Detroit Shock in the 2002 WNBA draft, second overall. After leading the Shock's resurgence in the second half of her rookie season, she then led the Detroit Shock to their first WNBA Championship title in 2003. She played in the 2003 WNBA All-Star Game and won the gold medal with the U.S. women's basketball team at the 2004 Olympic Games.

In the off-season, Cash has appeared as a studio analyst on ESPN's NBA Fastbreak  (according to ESPN.com) and during the 2008 Beijing Olympic games, she alternated with Teresa Edwards in presenting in-game commentary for NBC's presentation of the women's basketball tournament from the network's New York broadcast studios. Swin appeared (as herself) in the movie Bring It On: All or Nothing.

Cash received the Dapper Dan Sportswoman of the Year award given to someone who shows excellence to the Pittsburgh area.  She was also honored with Sidney Crosby and Dan Rooney.

Cash left Detroit for the 2008 season after "struggling to build a consistent relationship with Detroit Shock head coach Bill Laimbeer". On February 19, 2008, Cash was traded to the Seattle Storm for the draft rights of No. 4 pick in the 2008 WNBA draft. The Shock selected Alexis Hornbuckle with their draft pick. Cash along with Sue Bird and Lauren Jackson helped the Storm win their second championship in 2010.  On January 2, 2012, in perhaps the WNBA's biggest blockbuster trade news thus far, Cash was traded, along with Le'Coe Willingham, to the Chicago Sky joining All- Star Sylvia Fowles.

Cash has been suffering from a herniated disk for more than two years, an injury suffered while helping the Detroit Shock win the WNBA championship in 2006. In 2009, she came back to Connecticut to lead the Western Conference over the Eastern Conference at Mohegan Sun in Uncasville, Connecticut.  She led all scorers with an All-Star record of 22 points in a 130–118 win.  The previous high was 20 by Cash's former Detroit teammate, Deanna Nolan, in 2005.

Cash was invited to the USA Basketball Women's National Team training camp in the fall of 2009. The team selected to play for the 2010 FIBA World Championship and the 2012 Olympics is usually chosen from these participants. At the conclusion of the training camp, the team will travel to Ekaterinburg, Russia, where they compete in the 2009 UMMC Ekaterinburg International Invitational.

Cash was one of twenty players named to the national team pool. Twelve of this group will be chosen to represent the US in the 2010 World Championships and the 2012 Olympics.

Cash was selected to be a member of the National team representing the US at the World Championships held in September and October 2010. The team was coached by Geno Auriemma. Because many team members were still playing in the WNBA until just prior to the event, the team had only one day of practice with the entire team before leaving for Ostrava and Karlovy Vary, Czech Republic. Even with limited practice, the team managed to win its first games against Greece by 26 points. The team continued to dominate with victory margins exceeding 20 points in the first five games. Several players shared scoring  honors, with Cash, Angel McCoughtry, Maya Moore, Diana Taurasi, Lindsay Whalen, and Sylvia Fowles all ending as high scorer in the first few games. The sixth game was against undefeated Australia — the USA jumped out to a 24-point lead and the USA prevailed 83–75. The USA won its next two games by over 30 points, then faced the host team, the Czech Republic, in the championship game. The USA team had only a five-point lead at halftime, which was cut to three points, but the Czechs never got closer. Team USA went on to win the championship and gold medal. Cash averaged 8.6 points per game.

Cash was named as one of the  National team members to represent the USA Basketball team in the WNBA versus USA Basketball. This game replaces the normal WNBA All-Star game with WNBA All-Stars versus USA Basketball, as part of the preparation for the FIBA World Championship for Women to be held in the Czech Republic during September and October 2010.

Cash was one of 21 finalists for the U.S. Women's Olympic Basketball Team Roster. The 20 professional women's basketball players, plus one collegiate player (Brittney Griner), were selected by the USA Basketball Women's National Team Player Selection Committee to compete for the final roster which will represent the US at the 2012 Olympics in London. Cash made the final roster and played for the U.S. team that won the 2012 Olympic gold medal.

Washington and Jefferson College awarded Cash with an honorary degree in Doctorate of Public Service at their commencement ceremonies in May 2011 to honor her charity work. Cash is the founder of the Pennsylvania-based Cash for Kids charitable organization.

Cash was waived by New York Liberty on May 11, 2016. On May 24, 2016, it was reported that Cash re-signed with the Liberty for the remainder of the season. She was immediately eligible for their game versus the Atlanta Dream on that day.

On June 7, 2016, Cash announced that she would retire at the end of the 2016 season.

Anti-racism and anti-violence activism 
Cash is an advocate against gun violence and police brutality. In 2016, she was fined $500 by the Association, along with her teammates and players from two other WNBA teams, for wearing warm up shirts that read "#BlackLivesMatter" and "#Dallas5", both serving as references to gun violence. In a post-game debriefing following the incident, Cash stated:I think it’s a shame that we keep seeing people that want to make this movement as something that’s violent. Five cops gave their lives up trying to protect a peaceful movement. And in this country, I do believe that you can assemble peacefully and protest against injustice. So until the system transforms, we cannot sit here and act like there is not a problem here in America.She said that part of what motivated her to take a stance against police violence was the Civil Rights Movement era stories her grandmother told her. She recognizes that police brutality is an aspect of racial activism, and she fears that because police are able to kill unarmed people without facing arrests, a regression to pre-Civil Rights laws and practices may occur for black people. In addition, her brother, Kevin Menifee, was allegedly beaten by police officers, who broke his nose.

College statistics

WNBA career statistics

Regular season

|-
| align="left" | 2002
| align="left" | Detroit
| 32 || 32 || 33.7 || .408 || .206 || .762 || 6.9 || 2.7 || 1.1 || 0.9 || 3.1 || 14.8
|-
|style="text-align:left;background:#afe6ba;"| 2003†
| align="left" | Detroit
| 33 || 33 || 33.2 || .453 || .300 || .682 || 5.8 || 3.6 || 1.3 || 0.7 || 3.2 || 16.6
|-
| align="left" | 2004
| align="left" | Detroit
| 32 || 32 || 34.5 || .469 || .348 || .721 || 6.5 || 4.2 || 1.3 || 0.9 || 2.5 || 16.4
|-
| align="left" | 2005
| align="left" | Detroit
| 21 || 21 || 21.8 || .381 || .200 || .656 || 4.2 || 2.0 || 0.5 || 0.2 || 2.2 || 5.7
|-
|style="text-align:left;background:#afe6ba;"|2006†
| align="left" | Detroit
| 34 || 34 || 29.1 || .384 || .077 || .762 || 4.9 || 3.1 || 0.5 || 0.3 || 2.5 || 10.5
|-
| align="left" | 2007
| align="left" | Detroit
| 31 || 31 || 30.9 || .410 || .000 || .760 || 6.1 || 2.5 || 0.6 || 0.4 || 2.6 || 11.1
|-
| align="left" | 2008
| align="left" | Seattle
| 31 || 28 || 29.9 || .389 || .125 || .772 || 5.4 || 1.9 || 0.6 || 1.0 || 2.2 || 11.3
|-
| align="left" | 2009
| align="left" | Seattle
| 32 || 29 || 34.2 || .392 || .323 || .797 || 6.7 || 2.6 || 0.8 || 0.5 || 2.8 || 12.2
|-
|style="text-align:left;background:#afe6ba;"|2010†
| align="left" | Seattle
| 34 || 34 || 30.8 || .435  || .407 || .807 || 6.0 || 2.0 || 0.5 || 0.5 || 2.8 || 13.8
|-
| align="left" | 2011
| align="left" | Seattle
| 34 || 34 || 33.2 || .396 || .285 || .846 || 6.9 || 2.4 || 0.9 || 0.6 || 2.7 || 13.3
|-
| align="left" | 2012
| align="left" | Chicago
| 34 || 34 || 30.0 || .367 || .281 || .765 || 5.8 || 2.3 || 1.0 || 0.5 || 2.7 || 10.6
|-
| align="left" | 2013
| align="left" | Chicago
| 34 || 34 || 28.3 || .415 || .270 || .853 || 5.6 || 2.2 || 0.9 || 0.5 || 1.8 || 9.3
|-
| align="left" | 2014
| align="left" | Atlanta
| 17 || 1 || 8.7 || .233 || .000 || .400 || 0.9 || 0.7 || 0.3 || 0.1 || 0.7 || 1.5
|-
| align="left" | 2014
| align="left" | New York
| 15 || 4 || 16.2 || .354 || .010 || .833 || 2.9 || 1.4 || 0.4 || 0.1 || 1.4 || 4.5
|- 
| align="left" | 2014*
| align="left" | Total
| 32 || 5 || 12.5 || .294 || .005 || .617 || 1.9 || 1.1 || 0.4 || 0.1 || 1.1 || 3.0
|- 
| align="left" | 2015
| align="left" | New York
| 34 || 28 || 17.4 || .376 || .235 || .727 || 2.4 || 1.4 || 0.2 || 0.0 || 1.0 || 4.5
|-
| align="left" | 2016
| align="left" | New York
| 31 || 23 || 19.5 || .379 || .125 || .683 || 3.4 || 1.4 || 0.7 || 0.4 || 1.3 || 5.3
|-
| align="left" | Career
| align="left" |15 years, 5 teams
| 479 || 432 || 28.1 || .407 || .276 || .757 || 5.3 || 2.4 || 0.8 || 0.5 || 2.4 || 10.7

Postseason

|-
|style="text-align:left;background:#afe6ba;"| 2003†
| align="left" | Detroit
| 8 || 8 || 36.1 || .413 || .200 || .808 || 6.4 || 4.4 || 0.5 || 0.6 || 3.5 || 16.3
|-
| align="left" | 2005
| align="left" | Detroit
| 2 || 2 || 25.5 || .308 || .000 || .727 || 4.5 || 3.5 || 1.5 || 1.0 || 2.0 || 8.0
|-
|style="text-align:left;background:#afe6ba;"| 2006†
| align="left" | Detroit
| 10 || 10 || 26.5 || .363 || .000 || .720 || 6.1 || 3.2 || 0.3 || 0.3 || 2.2 || 7.6
|-
| align="left" | 2007
| align="left" | Detroit
| 11 || 11 || 25.2 || .451 || .000 || .565 || 3.8 || 1.6 || 0.4 || 0.1 || 1.6 || 8.6
|-
| align="left" | 2008
| align="left" | Seattle
| 3 || 0 || 14.7 || .333 || .000 || .000 || 3.7 || 0.7 || 0.3 || 0.6 || 1.0 || 2.7
|-
| align="left" | 2009
| align="left" | Seattle
| 3 || 3 || 38.7 || .487 || .400 || .840 || 5.3 || 1.7 || 2.3 || 1.0 || 2.0 || 21.0
|-
|style="text-align:left;background:#afe6ba;"|2010†
| align="left" | Seattle
| 7 || 7 || 31.4 || .506 || .500 || .786 || 4.9 || 3.0 || 1.2 || 0.7 || 3.1 || 16.1
|-
| align="left" | 2011
| align="left" | Seattle
| 3 || 3 || 32.0 || .333 || .286 || .750 || 8.7 || 2.0 || 1.0 || 0.6 || 1.3 || 7.0
|-
| align="left" | 2013
| align="left" | Chicago
| 2 || 2 || 27.8 || .333 || .000 || .875 || 1.5 || 1.0 || 1.5 || 0.5 || 1.0 || 5.5
|-
| align="left" | 2015
| align="left" | New York
| 6 || 6 || 19.0 || .316 || .200 || .714 || 3.0 || 1.7 || 0.8 || 0.5 || 1.1 || 3.8
|-
| align="left" | 2016
| align="left" | New York
| 1 || 1 || 11.6 || .000 || .000 || .000 || 1.0 || 0.0 || 0.0 || 0.0 || 0.0 || 0.0
|-
| align="left" | Career
| align="left" |11 years, 4 teams
| 56 || 53 || 27.5 || .418 || .319 || .758 || 4.9 || 2.5 || 0.8 || 0.5 || 2.1 || 9.9

Awards and achievements
 1998 WBCA All-American.
 2000 Big East Third Team
 2000 Big East Tournament All Tournament Team
 2002 Big East First Team
 2002 Big East Tournament All Tournament Team
 2002 NCAA basketball tournament Most Outstanding Player
 2009 WNBA All-Star Selection (MVP)
 2011 Honorary Doctorate of Public Service from Washington and Jefferson College
 2011 WNBA All-Star Selection (MVP)
 Honoree of the Boys and Girls Clubs Alumni Hall of Fame 
 4× NBA Sears Shooting Stars Champion: 2007, 2013-2015 (Team Chris Bosh, with Dominique Wilkins)
 2016 National Civil Rights Museum Freedom Award
 2020 Women's Basketball Hall of Fame Inductee

See also
 List of Connecticut women's basketball players with 1000 points

References

External links

Lunch Break Chat: Swin Cash
Swin Cash's U.S. Olympic Team bio ... with notes, quotes and photos
Swin Cash traded to the Seattle Storm

1979 births
Living people
African-American basketball players
All-American college women's basketball players
American expatriate basketball people in China
American expatriate basketball people in the Czech Republic
American expatriate basketball people in Russia
American women's basketball players
Atlanta Dream players
Basketball players at the 2004 Summer Olympics
Basketball players at the 2012 Summer Olympics
Basketball players from Pennsylvania
Chicago Sky players
Detroit Shock players
Guangdong Vermilion Birds players
Medalists at the 2004 Summer Olympics
Medalists at the 2012 Summer Olympics
New York Liberty players
Olympic gold medalists for the United States in basketball
Parade High School All-Americans (girls' basketball)
Power forwards (basketball)
Seattle Storm players
Sportspeople from McKeesport, Pennsylvania
UConn Huskies women's basketball players
Women's National Basketball Association All-Stars
21st-century African-American sportspeople
21st-century African-American women
20th-century African-American sportspeople
20th-century African-American women
20th-century African-American people
United States women's national basketball team players